The Nation was an Irish nationalist weekly newspaper, published in the 19th century. The Nation was printed first at 12 Trinity Street, Dublin from 15 October 1842 until 6 January 1844. The paper was afterwards published at 4 D'Olier Street from 13 July 1844, to 28 July 1848, when the issue for the following day was seized and the paper suppressed. It was published again in Middle Abbey Street on its revival in September 1849.

Background

The founders of  The Nation were three young men – two Catholics and one Protestant – who, according to the historian of the newspaper T. F. O'Sullivan, were all "free from the slightest taint of bigotry, and were anxious to unite all creeds and classes for the country's welfare.". They were Charles Gavan Duffy, its first editor; Thomas Davis, and John Blake Dillon. All three were members of Daniel O'Connell's Repeal Association, which sought repeal of the 1800 Act of Union between Ireland and Britain; this association would later be known as Young Ireland.The name suggested by Duffy for the paper was The National, but Davis disagreed, suggesting "that the use of an adjective for such a purpose was contrary to the analogies of the English language". He suggested The Nation, which was assented to by all three. "We desired to make Ireland a nation", Duffy wrote, "and the name would be a fitting prelude to the attempt.". In due course and after many other consultations between the founders, the following announcement was made as to the date of publication, the name of the journal, and the contributors:.
On the first Saturday in October will be published the first number of a;
DUBLIN WEEKLY JOURNAL
TO BE CALLED
THE NATION,
for which the services of the most eminent political writers in the country have been secured.
It will be edited by
Charles Gavan Duffy, Editor of The Vindicator (Ulster Newspaper), aided by the, following distinguished contributors:—
JOHN O'CONNELL, ESQ., M.P.;
Thomas Osborne Davis, Esq., Barrister-at-Law;
W. J. O'Neill Daunt, Esq., Author of The Green Book,
John B. Dillon, Esq., Barrister-at-Law
Clarence Mangan, Esq., Author of Anthologia Germanica and Litterae Orientales;
The Late Editor of the London Magazine and Charivari,
J. C. Fitzgerald, Editor of The True Sun,
And others whose names we are not at liberty
to publish.

The paper was first published on Saturday 15 October 1842.

The Prospectus of The Nation

In the Prospectus, which was written by Davis with the exception of one sentence, it was stated,
The projectors of the NATION have been told that there is no room in Ireland for another Liberal Journal; but they think differently. They believe that since the success of the long and gallant struggle which our fathers maintained against sectarian ascendancy, a NEW MIND has grown up amongst us, which longs to redress other wrongs and achieve other victories; and that this mind has found no adequate expression in the press.
The Liberal Journals of Ireland were perhaps never more ably conducted than at this moment; but their tone and spirit are not of the present but the past;—their energies are shackled by old habits, old prejudices, and old divisions; and they do not and cannot keep in the van of the advancing people.
The necessities of the country seem to demand a Journal able to aid and organise the new movements going on amongst us—to make their growth deeper, and their fruit 'more racy of the soil'— and, above all, to direct the popular mind and the sympathies of educated men of all parties to the great end of nationality. Such a Journal should be free from the quarrels, the interests, the wrongs, and even the gratitude of the past. It should be free to apply its strength where it deems best— free to praise—free to censure; unshackled by sect or party; able, Irish, and independent.
Holding these views, the projectors of the Nation cannot think that a Journal, prepared to undertake this work, will be deemed superfluous; and as they labour, not for themselves but for their country, they are prepared, if they do not find a way open, to try if they cannot make one.
Nationality is their first object—a nationality which will not only raise our people from their poverty, by securing to them the blessings of a domestic legislature, but inflame and purify them with a lofty and heroic love of country—a nationality of the spirit as well as the letter—a nationality which may come to be stamped upon our manners, our literature, and our deeds—a nationality which may embrace Protestant, Catholic, and Dissenter, Milesian and Cromwellian, the Irishman of a hundred generations, and the stranger who is within our gates; not a nationality which would preclude civil war, but which would establish internal union and external independence—a nationality which would be recognised by the world, and sanctified by wisdom, virtue, and time.

As could be seen from the prospectus, as political objectives went, the programme was certain to be of immense assistance to Daniel O'Connell in his efforts to revive the agitation for Repeal, but O'Connell also knew and felt that he was receiving, for the present, a powerful support from them; but he knew also, that they were outside of his influence, and did not implicitly believe that Repeal would be yielded to "agitation"; that they were continually seeking, by their writings, to arouse a military spirit among the people; showing plainly, that while they helped the Repeal Association, they fully expected that the liberties of the country must be fought for in the end: it was in appearance only that they worked in harmony.

John Mitchel joined the staff of The Nation in the autumn of 1845. On Mitchel's frequent trips from Banbridge, Co Down to Dublin, he had come in contact with the Repeal members who gathered about The Nation office and in the spring of 1843 he became a member of the Repeal Association. For the next two years Mitchel wrote political and historical articles and reviews for The Nation. He covered a wide range of subjects, including the Great Famine, on which he contributed some influential articles which attracted significant attention.

Mitchel resigned his position as leader writer on The Nation, he himself wrote years afterwards, because he came to regard as "absolutely necessary a more vigorous policy against the English Government than that which William Smith O'Brien, Charles Gavan Duffy and other Young Ireland leaders were willing to pursue". In 1847, when he severed his connection with The Nation, he wrote, "I had watched the progress of the famine policy of the Government, and could see nothing in it but a machinery, deliberately devised, and skillfully worked, for the entire subjugation of the island—the slaughter of portion of the people, and the pauperization of the rest", and he had therefore "come to the conclusion that the whole system ought to be met with resistance at every point, and the means for this would be extremely simple, namely, a combination among the people to obstruct and render impossible the transport and shipment of Irish provisions; to refuse all aid to its removal; to destroy the highways; to prevent everyone, by intimidation, from daring to bid for grain and cattle if brought to auction under 'distress' (a method of obstruction which put an end to Church tithes before); in short, to offer a passive resistance universally; but occasionally, when opportunity served, to try the steel." To recommend such a course would be extremely hazardous, and was besides in advance of the revolutionary progress made up to that time by Mr. Duffy, the proprietor of The Nation, Mitchel therefore resigned from the journal, and started his own paper, The United Irishman.

Women wrote for the paper, and published under pseudonyms such as Mary (Ellen Mary Patrick Dowling); Speranza (Jane Elgee, Lady Wilde, Oscar Wilde's mother), known universally as "Speranza" of The Nation; and Eva (Mary Eva Kelly, who would marry Kevin Izod O'Doherty).  These three were known as the "Three Graces" of The Nation.  Eithne (Marie Thompson), Finola (Elizabeth Willoughby Treacy), Ruby (Rose Kavanagh) and Thomasine (Olivia Knight) were others.  In July 1848 Jane Wilde and Margaret Callan assumed editorial control of The Nation during Gavan Duffy's imprisonment in Newgate.

The role played by some of its key figures in the paper in the ill-fated Young Irelander Rebellion of 1848 cemented the paper's reputation as the voice of Irish radicalism. Dillon was a central figure in the revolt and was sentenced to death, the sentence later commuted. He fled Ireland, escaping first to France and, eventually, to the United States, where he served the New York Bar.

Its triumvirate of founders followed differing paths. Davis died, aged 30, in 1845. Both Dillon and Duffy became Members of Parliament (MPs) in the House of Commons of the United Kingdom. Duffy emigrated to Australia where he became premier of the state of Victoria, later being knighted as a Knight Commander of St Michael and St George (KCMG). Dillon died in 1866. His son, John Dillon became leader of the Irish Parliamentary Party and his grandson, James Dillon, leader of Fine Gael.

The Nation continued to be published until 1900, when it merged with the Irish Weekly Independent. Later political figures associated with the paper included TD Sullivan and JJ Clancy.

Contributors

Denis Florence MacCarthy
C. P. Meehan
William Carleton
John Keegan Casey
John Mitchel
John Kenyon
Michael Doheny
Thomas D'Arcy McGee
Richard Robert Madden
John Kells Ingram (author of "The Memory of the Dead")
Edward Walsh
James Fintan Lalor
Thomas Devin Reilly
John Edward Pigot
Charles Kickham
Jane Wilde
Richard D'Alton Williams
Thomas MacNevin
John Cashel Hoey, editor 1849–57.
Michael Hogan – "The Bard of Thomond"
Hugh Heinrick

Notes and references

Further reading
The Politics of Irish Literature: from Thomas Davis to W.B. Yeats, Malcolm Brown, Allen &  Unwin, 1973.
John Mitchel, A Cause Too Many, Aidan Hegarty, Camlane Press.
Thomas Davis, The Thinker and Teacher, Arthur Griffith, M.H. Gill & Son 1922.
Brigadier-General Thomas Francis Meagher His Political and Military Career,Capt. W. F. Lyons, Burns Oates & Washbourne Limited 1869
Young Ireland and 1848, Dennis Gwynn,	Cork University Press 1949.
Daniel O'Connell The Irish Liberator, Dennis Gwynn,	Hutchinson & Co, Ltd.
O'Connell Davis and the Colleges Bill,	Dennis Gwynn,	Cork University Press 1948.
Smith O'Brien And The "Secession", Dennis Gwynn,Cork University Press
Meagher of The Sword,	Edited By Arthur Griffith,	M. H. Gill & Son, Ltd. 1916.
Young Irelander Abroad The Diary of Charles Hart, Edited by Brendan O'Cathaoir,	University Press.
John Mitchel First Felon for Ireland, Edited By Brian O'Higgins, Brian O'Higgins 1947.
Rossa's Recollections 1838 to 1898, Intro by Sean O'Luing, The Lyons Press 2004.
Labour in Ireland, James Connolly, Fleet Street 1910.
The Re-Conquest of Ireland, James Connolly,	Fleet Street 1915.
John Mitchel Noted Irish Lives, Louis J. Walsh,	The Talbot Press Ltd 1934.
Thomas Davis: Essays and Poems, Centenary Memoir, M. H Gill, M.H. Gill & Son, Ltd MCMXLV.
Life of John Martin,	P. A. Sillard,	James Duffy & Co., Ltd 1901.
Life of John Mitchel,	P. A. Sillard,	James Duffy and Co., Ltd 1908.
John Mitchel,	P. S. O'Hegarty, Maunsel & Company, Ltd 1917.
The Fenians in Context Irish Politics & Society 1848–82, R. V. Comerford, Wolfhound Press 1998
William Smith O'Brien and the Young Ireland Rebellion of 1848,	Robert Sloan, Four Courts Press 2000
Irish Mitchel,	Seamus MacCall,	Thomas Nelson and Sons Ltd 1938.
Ireland Her Own, T. A. Jackson,	Lawrence & Wishart Ltd 1976.
Life and Times of Daniel O'Connell,	T. C. Luby,	Cameron & Ferguson.
Young Ireland,	T. F. O'Sullivan, The Kerryman Ltd. 1945.
Irish Rebel John Devoy and America's Fight for Irish Freedom, Terry Golway, St. Martin's Griffin 1998.
Paddy's Lament Ireland 1846–1847 Prelude to Hatred,  Thomas Gallagher,	Poolbeg 1994.
The Great Shame, Thomas Keneally, Anchor Books 1999.
James Fintan Lalor, Thomas, P. O'Neill, Golden Publications 2003.
Charles Gavan Duffy: Conversations With Carlyle (1892), with Introduction, Stray Thoughts On Young Ireland, by Brendan Clifford, Athol Books, Belfast, . (Pg. 32 Titled, Foster's account Of Young Ireland.)
Envoi, Taking Leave Of Roy Foster, by Brendan Clifford and Julianne Herlihy, Aubane Historical Society, Cork.
The Falcon Family, or, Young Ireland, by M. W. Savage, London, 1845. (An Gorta Mor)Quinnipiac University

External links
Irish News Archive- The full archives of The Nation

1842 establishments in Ireland
1900 disestablishments in Ireland
Defunct newspapers published in Ireland
Defunct weekly newspapers
Newspapers established in 1842
Publications disestablished in 1900
Young Ireland